Carlos Oscar Reichenbach Filho (14 June 1945 – 14 June 2012) was a Brazilian filmmaker.

Early life and career
Reichenbach was born in Porto Alegre to Luise Reichenbach (née Tinger) and Carlos Reichenbach. Reichenbach was one year of age when he came to live in São Paulo. He studied in the School of Cinema São Luiz, where he was a student of Luis Sérgio Person. With João Callegaro and Antonio Lima he made his first feature-length films – the film episodes of As Libertinas (1968) and Audácia, a fúria dos desejos (1969).

Death

Reichenbach died on his 67th birthday from heart failure while being taken to a São Paulo hospital. Reichenbach is buried at Cemiterio de Redemptor in São Paulo.

Selected filmography

Writer

 So This Augusta Street (1967)
 The Voluptuous (1968)
 As Libertinas (1968)
 Audácia, a fúria dos desejos (1969)
 Audácia (1970)
 Race in Search of Love (1972)
 The Guru and Gurls (1973)
 Lillian M: Confidential Report (1974)
 Sede de Amar (1977)
 The Forbidden Pleasure Island (1978)
 Love, Word Prostitute (1980)
 Dream of Life (1980)
 Blood Corsair (1980)
 The Empire of Desire (1981)
 Forbidden Paradise (1981)
 The Safadas (1982)
 Extreme Pleasure (1984)
 Movie Dementia (1985)
 Anjos do Arrabalde (1986)
 City Life (1990)
 Soul Corsair (1993)
 Look and Feel (1994)
 Two Streams (1999)
 Balance & Grace (2003)
 Girls ABC (2004)
 Confiscated Goods (2005)
 Fake Blonde (2007)
 Start a History (2010)

Actor
 The Red Light Bandit (1968) - Gangster
 Sertão em Festa (1970)
 Ritual dos Sádicos (1970)
 O Pornógrafo (1970)
 The End of Man (1971)
 Os Amores de Um Cafona (1971)
 No Rancho Fundo (1971)
 O Jeca e o Bode (1972)
 Gringo, o Último Matador (1972)
 Corrida em Busca do Amor (1972) - Ivan
 Ainda Agarro Esse Machão (1975)
 A Casa das Tentações (1975)
 O Vampiro da Cinemateca (1977)
 Noite em Chamas (1977)
 Belas e Corrompidas (1977)
 A Mulher Que Inventou o Amor (1979)
 Extremos do Prazer (1984)
 Filme Demência (1986) - Man In The Public Piss House
 O Corpo (1991)
 Girls ABC (2004)
 Avanti Popolo (2012) - The Father (final film orle)

References

External links

 Carlos Reichenbach website
 Reduto do comodoro - Carlos Reichenbach's Blog

1945 births
2012 deaths
Brazilian filmmakers
People from Porto Alegre
Brazilian people of German descent